Boulenophrys binlingensis is a species of frog in the family Megophryidae from China. Its type locality is Binling, Hongya County, Sichuan, which is located to the north-west of Mount Emei.

References

binlingensis
Amphibians described in 2009